Bird Grove House, known locally as the George Eliot house, is a two storey stucco house in Foleshill, Coventry. It was occupied by Mary Ann Evans (better known as George Eliot) and her father between 1841 and 1849.

History
Mary Ann Evans accompanied her father, Robert Evans, to the property in Foleshill when he retired in 1841. She lived there as his housekeeper until his death in 1849, when she moved to London. Her time at Bird Grove House greatly influenced her career, as this is where she became acquainted with the Bray family and the “Rosehill Circle” of intellectuals and radicals. The fictional town of Middlemarch that features in her novel of the same name is based on Coventry. The house was Grade II* listed in 1974 because of its connection to Eliot and some of its period features. In more recent times the building was used as a community education centre, but now stands empty. In 2018 it was identified as being “at risk” by the organisation SAVE Britain’s Heritage.

See also
Arbury Hall - birthplace of Mary Ann Evans
Griff House - childhood home

References

Buildings and structures in Coventry
Grade II* listed buildings in the West Midlands (county)
Grade II* listed buildings in Warwickshire